CoRoT-15b is a transiting brown dwarf found by the CoRoT space telescope in 2010.

It is a brown dwarf-sized stellar companion orbiting a F7V star 2MASS J06282781+0611105.

References

Hot Jupiters
Brown dwarfs
Transiting exoplanets
Exoplanets discovered in 2010
15b
Monoceros (constellation)